Peter Maddocks (born 1 April 1928) is an English cartoonist.

He has contributed to many of the United Kingdom's leading daily and Sunday national papers with cartoon series such as Four D. Jones in the Daily Express in the late 1950s and early 1960s. He has also created children's animated series for the BBC, including The Family-Ness, Penny Crayon, Jimbo and the Jet-Set and The Caribou Kitchen.

Education
Maddocks was born in Birmingham on 1 April 1928. In 1939 he won a scholarship to the city's Moseley School of Art, where he was taught by Norman Pett. At the age of 15, Maddocks decided to leave school and join the Merchant Navy from 1943 to 1949.

Career
After his six years in the Navy, Maddocks set up his own advertising agency, for which he designed cinema posters and wrote western series. He produced his first cartoons for the Daily Sketch from 1953 to 1954. From 1955 to 1965 he worked for the Daily Express, for which he created his comic strip Four D. Jones. In this comic, a cowboy travelled in the fourth dimension. This comic was a success for ten years for the Sunday Express. He later became the Cartoon Editor for Express Newspapers from 1965 to 1966, and from 1968 to 1971 he was the Special Features Editor of King magazine. Maddocks' characters tend to have google eyes with splayed out fingers.

Contributions

Maddocks has made contributions to the following:
Daily Star
Daily Record 
Manchester Evening News
Mail on Sunday
Private Eye
Daily Mirror
Daily Telegraph 
Evening Standard 
Evening News
Sunday Telegraph 
Mayfair 
Woman's Own

References

External links
 

1928 births
Living people
English cartoonists
British comics artists
People from Birmingham, West Midlands
English animators